The Tyne and Wear Metro is an overground and underground light rail rapid transit system serving Newcastle upon Tyne, Gateshead, North Tyneside, South Tyneside, and the City of Sunderland (together forming Tyne and Wear). The network opened in stages from August 1980 and now serves a total of 60 stations, with two lines covering  of track. The Metro can be accessed from a mixture of under ground and above ground stations. It has been described as the "first modern light rail system in the United Kingdom". The system is currently owned and operated by the Tyne and Wear Passenger Transport Executive (branded as Nexus), thus is fully under public ownership and operation.

In 2018–19, an estimated 36.4million passenger journeys were made on the Metro, making it the third-most used light rail network in the United Kingdom after London's Docklands Light Railway (121.8million passenger journeys) and Manchester Metrolink (43.7million passenger journeys).

The initial Tyne and Wear Metro network opened between August 1980 and March 1984, mostly using converted former railway lines linked with new tunnel infrastructure. Further extensions to the original network were opened in November 1991 (from Bank Foot to Airport) and March 2002 (from Pelaw to Sunderland and South Hylton).

History

Predecessor

The present system uses much former railway infrastructure, mostly constructed between 1834 and 1882, one of the oldest parts being the Newcastle and North Shields Railway, which opened in 1839. In 1904, in response to tramway competition which was taking away passengers, the North Eastern Railway started electrifying parts of their local railway network north of the River Tyne with a 600V DC third-rail system, forming one of the earliest suburban electric networks, known as the Tyneside Electrics.

Under British Rail in the 1960s, the decision was made to de-electrify the Tyneside Electrics network and convert it to diesel operation, owing to falling passenger numbers and the cost of renewing end-of-life electrical infrastructure and rolling stock. The Newcastle to South Shields line was de-electrified in 1963, followed by the North Tyneside routes, in 1967. This was widely viewed as a backward step, as the diesel trains were slower than the electric trains they replaced.

Planning and construction
In the early 1970s, the poor local transport system was identified as one of the main factors holding back the region's economy, and in 1971 a study was commissioned by the recently created Tyneside Passenger Transport Authority (now known as Nexus) into how the transport system could be improved.

This study recommended reviving the badly run-down former Tyneside Electrics network by converting it into an electrified rapid transit system, which would include a new underground section to better serve the busy central areas of Newcastle and Gateshead, as it was felt that the existing rail network didn't serve these areas adequately. This new system was intended to be the core of a new integrated transport network, with buses acting as feeders to purpose-built transport interchanges. The plans were approved by the Tyneside Metropolitan Railway Act]], which was passed by Parliament in July 1973. Around 70% of the funding for the scheme came from a central government grant, with the remainder coming from local sources.

Around  of the new infrastructure was in tunnels, whilst the remainder was either at ground level or elevated.

Construction work began in October 1974. This involved the construction of the new infrastructure, re-electrifying the routes with overhead line equipment, the upgrading or relocation of existing stations, and the construction of several new stations, some of which were underground. By 1984, the final cost of the project was £265million (equivalent to £million in ). The Tyne and Wear Metro was the first railway in the United Kingdom to operate using the metric system, with all speeds and distances stated in metric units only. It was also the first transport system in the United Kingdom to be designed to be fully accessible to passengers with disabilities, with step-free access available at all stations across the network.

Opening

Originally, the Tyne and Wear Metro was intended to be opened in stages between 1979 and 1981. The first stages of the original network (between Haymarket and Tynemouth) opened in August 1980, with the final stage (between Heworth and South Shields) opening in March 1984. Extensions to Newcastle Airport and Sunderland opened in 1991 and 2002 respectively. The opening dates of services and stations are as follows:

11 August 1980: Haymarket to Tynemouth via Benton
10 May 1981: South Gosforth to Bank Foot
15 November 1981: Heworth to Haymarket
14 November 1982: St. James to Tynemouth via Wallsend
24 March 1984: Heworth to South Shields
15 September 1985: Kingston Park
16 September 1985: Pelaw
19 March 1986: Palmersville
17 November 1991: Bank Foot to Airport
31 March 2002: Pelaw to South Hylton
28 April 2002: Park Lane
11 December 2005: Northumberland Park
17 March 2008: Simonside

Integration
When the Tyne and Wear Metro first opened, it was intended to form part of an integrated public transport system, with the local bus network reconfigured to act as 'feeder' services for the Metro. The Metro was intended to cover trunk journeys, while buses were re-designed towards shorter, local trips, to bring passengers to and from Metro stations, using unified ticketing, and with their timetable integrated with the Metro schedule. Integration was short-lived, and lasted until the deregulation of bus services, in 1986. It is, however, still possible to purchase Transfare tickets, to combine a journey made using multiple modes of transport in Tyne and Wear.

Expansion and growth

Extension to Newcastle Airport 
In November 1991, the Tyne and Wear Metro was extended to Newcastle Airport – at a cost of £12million.

Extension to Wearside 
The extension used part of the existing Durham Coast Line, with the line being adapted to allow a shared service between Metro and rail services – therefore becoming the first system in the United Kingdom to implement a form of the Karlsruhe model. Between Pelaw and Sunderland, intermediate stations at Brockley Whins, East Boldon and Seaburn were re-built, with a further three being purpose-built for the network, at Fellgate, Stadium of Light and St. Peter's. Five purpose-built stations at Park Lane, University, Millfield, Pallion and South Hylton were constructed for the network.

Upgrades and development

Project Orpheus 
In 2002, Nexus unveiled an ambitious 15-year plan for transport in Tyne and Wear, named Project Orpheus. The project, valued at £1.5billion, aimed to extend the existing Metro network, including links to Cramlington, Doxford Park, Killingworth, Metrocentre, Seaham, Team Valley and Washington. In addition to this, plans would see the introduction of street-running trams, river buses across the Tyne, and cable cars, linking 29 key corridors. The project has since been abandoned, with plans reworked and developed into the Metro: All Change programme.

Metro: All Change

Phase 1 
The first phase of Metro's All Change programme saw the start of a £25million project to install new ticket machines at all 60 stations across the network. Unlike the former ticket machines, which only accepted payment with coins, the new machines are able to accept payment with credit and debit card (with an upgrade to accept contactless payment in 2013), notes and coins. Automated ticket barriers (at 13 stations), and smart card validators at all stations across the network were also introduced, as part of the first phase of the All Change programme.

The first phase of the programme also saw the completion of a new station at Simonside, in March 2008, as well as the refurbishment and modernisation of Haymarket, in 2009. An upgrade of platforms at Sunderland, and the refurbishment and modernisation of several other stations was also undertaken during this phase. Lifts and escalators were replaced at several stations, between 2009 and 2016. Phase 1 of the programme also involved the overhaul of infrastructure, including communications, track and overhead power lines, structures and embankments.

Phase 2 
Phase 2 of the All Change programme saw the £20million refurbishment of 86 Tyne & Wear Metrocars (originally all 90 Metrocars were due to be refurbished). Each Metrocar was stripped down to its frame and built back up again, with the addition of improved disabled access, new door control systems, and renewed interiors, seating and lighting. A new cadmium yellow and black livery was also adopted. Work commenced in June 2010, at Wabtec at Doncaster Works, and was completed five months ahead of schedule, in August 2015. The first Metrocar to receive refurbishment was 4041, the unit being named after former Gateshead Councillor and MP, Harry Cowans, in honour of his work in the 1970s, to help to secure the construction of the network.

The second phase of the programme also saw the modernisation of a further 45 stations, including the re-building of the station at North Shields, which was completed in September 2012, as well as the installation of new communications system, and the overhaul and maintenance of structures such as bridges, tunnels, track and overhead power lines.

Phase 3 
The third phase of Metro's All Change programme began in 2019, with the procurement of a new fleet of 46 (originally 42) units, designed by Swiss manufacturer, Stadler. Delivery of the new rolling stock began in February 2023, with the first unit expected to enter service some time between September and November 2023, and the remainder following into 2024 or 2025. It will also see the introduction of a new signalling system, overhaul and maintenance of structures, track and overhead lines, and further station improvements.

Maintenance and Renewals Skills Centre 
In July 2018, Nexus announced the beginning of work to construct the new Maintenance and Renewals Skills Centre, at Mile End Road in South Shields. Construction began in August 2018 and was opened in November 2020. The £8.4million project saw the construction of a three-storey training centre, with classrooms, a mock control room, driver training simulator, covered tracks and inspection pits, and a mock Metro station, as well as a  stretch of dual track, to be used to carry out infrastructure training, including track, points, signalling and overhead line. The site is also used to stable and maintain a small number of vehicles.

Metro Flow 
In March 2020, the government announced a £103million scheme, known as Metro Flow, during the 2020 Budget. The project aims to increase frequency from 5 to 6 trains per hour, reduce journey times and improve service reliability. From September 2022, the project will see three sections of single line between Pelaw and Bede converted to dual use, with an existing freight-only line electrified, and re-designed to operate using a similar system to the shared line between Pelaw and Sunderland. As part of the project, four additional Stadler units have been funded, bringing the total number of units on order from 42 to 46.

Service and frequency

The Tyne and Wear Metro network consists of two lines:

 Green Line: South Hylton to Airport
 Yellow Line: South Shields to St. James via Whitley Bay

Services commence between 05:00 and 06:00 (between 06:00 and 07:00 on Sunday), with frequent trains running until around midnight. Each line runs up to every 12 minutes during the day (Monday to Saturday), and up to every 15 minutes during the evening and on Sunday. This allows for a combined frequency of up to every six minutes (Monday to Saturday), and up to every seven to eight minutes during the evening and on Sunday, between Pelaw and South Gosforth. Additional trains run during morning and evening peak hours (Monday to Friday) between Pelaw and Regent Centre or Monkseaton. This provides a Metro up to every three minutes between Pelaw and South Gosforth, at peak times. Originally, there was also a Red Line between Heworth (later Pelaw) and Benton and a Blue Line between St James and North Shields. Additional trains ran on these lines during peak hours to increase the frequency at the busier stations.

Fleet and operations

Control Centre
The Metro Control Centre is based at Gosforth, in a building alongside the station at South Gosforth. It is responsible for operating the network's signalling and electrical supply, as well as being used to communicate with train drivers and other staff using two-way radio equipment. The original equipment at the control centre was replaced in 2007, with a new computerised signalling control system installed in August 2018 at a cost of £12million.

Depots

The Tyne and Wear Metro is currently operated from a single depot, also based in Gosforth. The depot was opened in 1923 by the London and North Eastern Railway and was used to house the former Tyneside Electrics stock. The depot was inherited by Metro, prior to the system's opening in August 1980. The depot is located at the centre of the triangular fork between the branch to Airport and the northern leg of the North Tyneside Loop. It is situated between stations at Longbenton, South Gosforth and Regent Centre; it is used for stabling, cleaning, maintenance and repair of the fleet. It can be accessed by trains from either east or west and there is also a depot-avoiding line running from east to west, which is not used in public service.

Prior to the arrival of new rolling stock towards the end of 2021, a new depot was constructed near Howdon, in North Tyneside. The site is used as a temporary stabling and maintenance facility for up to 10 Metrocars, whilst the current depot at South Gosforth is being reconfigured. The temporary depot at Howdon opened in August 2020. A further vehicle stabling and maintenance facility is also scheduled to open in South Tyneside, as part of the Maintenance and Renewals Skills Centre at South Shields.

Current fleet 

Since the Tyne and Wear Metro opened in 1980, it has operated using the same rolling stock. The fleet comprises a total of 87 (formerly 90, until March 2017) articulated units, known as Metrocars, which are numbered 4001–4090. The first units to be built were two prototypes, numbered 4001 and 4002, which were delivered for testing in 1975. These were followed by 88 production units, which were built between 1978 and 1981. The design of the Metrocar was based on the Stadtbahnwagen B, a German light rail vehicle developed in the early 1970s. The units were built by Metro-Cammell, Washwood Heath.

The fleet has been refurbished several times and several liveries have been used. The original livery used at opening was cadmium yellow and white, in accordance with the colours used by the Tyne and Wear Passenger Transport Executive at the time. A mid-life refurbishment of the fleet, carried out in-house, took place between 1995 and 2000; a new livery was adopted consisting of red, green or blue bodies, with yellow front and rear ends, and triangles containing the Metro logo on the doors.

A £20million refurbishment of 86 Metrocars (originally all 90 were due to be refurbished) began in June 2010, with the goal of the refurbishment programme being to extend the service life of until 2025 prior to the delivery of new rolling stock. Each Metrocar was stripped down to its frame and built back up again, with the addition of improved disabled access and new door control systems, with renewed interiors, seating and lighting. A new black, grey and yellow livery was also adopted. Refurbishment work was completed five months ahead of schedule in August 2015.

Future fleet

In 2016, Nexus unveiled plans to secure funding of £550million for a replacement fleet, with a target for them to be in service by the early 2020s. In November 2017, the Chancellor of the Exchequer, Philip Hammond, announced that the government would contribute £337million towards the new fleet. The proposed new fleet was planned to have dual-voltage capability, able to operate on the Metro's existing  electrification system as well as the  used on the Network Rail network, to allow for expansion of Metro service. Battery technology was considered.

In September 2018, Bombardier, CAF, a Downer Rail/CRRC joint venture, Hitachi and Stadler Rail were short-listed to build the new fleet. 
Stadler was awarded a contract to build and maintain 42 five-carriage light rail vehicles in January 2020, with deliveries to commence in late 2021 and all trains to be in passenger service by 2024. The new trains will feature next stop audio-visual information displays, Tube-style linear seating to increase capacity, wider doors and aisles, air conditioning, WiFi and charging points. Following the announcement of the £103million Metro Flow project, in March 2020, four additional Stadler units have been funded, bringing the total number of units on order from 42 to 46.

In September 2020, the Metro Futures website was launched, allowing the public to give their view on several elements of the new Metro fleet.

In December 2021, Nexus revealed that the Metro fleet had entered the final assembly phase at Stadler's factory in Switzerland and that the manufacturer is in the process of fitting the main interior components of the first of the new trains. The works include the installation of wheels, seats, equipment cases, piping, wiring, flooring, windows and other internal furnishings. In September 2022, Nexus released a video taken at Stadler's test track in Erlen of a unit moving under its own power for the first time, prior to beginning full trials. The first of the new fleet arrived at the Metro depot on 28 February 2023.

Ancillary vehicles
In addition to passenger trains, the Tyne and Wear Metro also operates three battery-electric locomotives (numbered BL1–BL3), which were manufactured by Hunslet in 1988. The company also operates a Plasser and Theurer ballast tamper and 15 wagons, which are used for maintenance and repair work.

Ownership 
The Tyne and Wear Metro is publicly owned, receiving funding from council tax payers and government. Nexus, which owns and manages the Metro, contracted out operations and train maintenance as part of a deal with the government, to secure modernisation investment and operating subsidy for the system between 2010 and 2021. Nexus continued to set fares, frequency of services and operating hours. Opponents would suggest that this was privatisation by the back door, though some services had already been contracted out, such as cleaning of stations and ticket inspections.

In November 2008, Nexus invited potential bidders to declare an interest in a contract to run the operations side of the business on its behalf. The successful bidder was to obtain a seven-year contract commencing on 1 April 2010, with up to an additional two years depending on performance. In February 2009, four bids were shortlisted: DB Regio, MTR Corporation, Serco-Abellio, and an in-house bid from Nexus. By October 2009, the shortlist had been reduced to bids from DB Regio and Nexus.

In December 2009, DB Regio was named as the preferred bidder, with the contract for operating the system signed in February 2010, and the handover of the service taking place in April 2010. One of DB Regio's first initiatives was the Metro Dig It programme, and involved the re-painting of stations and deep-cleaning of stations and trains. In February 2010, the government confirmed it would award Nexus up to £580million to modernise and operate the Tyne and Wear Metro, with up to £350million to be spent on the Metro: All Change programme, over the course of the following eleven years. A further £230million would support running and maintenance costs, over the following nine years.

As a result, between 2010 and 2017, the Metro was operated under contract by DB Regio.

In March 2016, Nexus announced that they did not intend to renew the contract with DB Regio, following the contract ending in 2017, after stating that they were dissatisfied with the operator due to missed performance targets.

In April 2017, Nexus took over direct operation of the system for a planned period of two years, with the intention to re-tender the contract. The RMT trade union, however, has argued that the direct operation should be made permanent, and operation of the system should remain in public ownership. As of March 2021, the Tyne and Wear Metro network is still under public ownership, with services operated by Nexus.

Infrastructure

Stations

The 60 stations on the Tyne and Wear Metro network vary widely in character. Some are former British Rail stations, whilst others were purpose-built for the Metro. Most of the stations are above ground, but several in central Newcastle and Gateshead are underground, namely Central, St. James and Gateshead. In Sunderland, Park Lane and  stations also have underground platforms. Four of the stations on the network, Central, Heworth, Manors and Sunderland, allow for interchange with National Rail services.  is only one of two stations in the United Kingdom where light and heavy rail services use the same platforms; the other is Rotherham Central, which since 2018 has served both Northern and TransPennine Express, and the Sheffield Supertram network.

Most Metro stations are not routinely staffed. However, the busiest stations in central Newcastle and Sunderland (Haymarket, Monument, Central, Sunderland and Park Lane) are all staffed until late in the evening, and St James, St Peters and Stadium of Light are also staffed on match days. All stations are equipped with ticket machines, shelters and seating, next train information displays, and emergency help points. Ticket machines are able to accept payment with credit and debit card (including contactless payment), notes and coins. Automated ticket barriers (at 13 stations), and smart card validators at all stations, were also installed during the first phase of Metro's All Change programme. Despite the majority of stations being open to access, the Tyne and Wear Metro has the third-highest level of passenger income per year (£45.2million in 2013/2014) of the eight light rail networks in England. Regular checks are made by patrols of inspectors, both at stations and on board trains. Passengers caught travelling on the Metro without a ticket are subject to a £20 penalty fare.

In 2022, installation of tactile paving at all Metro stations was completed.

Bicycles 
Most stations on the network have cycle racks, with smart cycle lockers located at 21 stations across the network (as of March 2020). Following a trial period in 2016, non-folding bicycles are permitted to travel on Metro between 10:00 and 15:00 and after 19:00 on weekdays, and all day at weekends, between Callerton Parkway and Jesmond, between Manors and Jesmond (via Whitley Bay), and between Gateshead Stadium and South Shields or South Hylton. Non-folding bicycles are not permitted to travel between Callerton Parkway and Airport, or between Jesmond and Gateshead Stadium at any time. Folding bicycles are permitted to travel without restriction, across the entire Metro network.

Tunnels 

Under Newcastle, two routes run underground at right angles to each other, and intersect at Monument, which has four platforms on two levels. The first route, shared by both the Green Line (from South Hylton to Airport) and Yellow Line (from South Shields to St. James), runs from north to south. It heads underground at Jesmond, and runs south through , Monument and Central, before rising above ground to cross the Queen Elizabeth II Bridge over the River Tyne. It then enters another tunnel, running underneath Gateshead, serving Gateshead, before rising above ground again before the station at Gateshead Stadium.

The second underground route, part of the Yellow Line (from South Shields to St. James), runs from east to west, heading underground after running east alongside the East Coast Main Line, before serving Manors and Monument, then terminating at St. James. Yellow Line trains pass through Monument twice, once eastbound through the east–west platforms, and then, after running around the North Tyneside Loop, southbound through the north–south platforms before running to South Shields.

The Tyne and Wear Metro is one of the few rapid transit systems in the world with a pretzel configuration, in which a line crosses over itself and trains pass through the same station twice at different platforms. This arrangement also exists at Voorweg on the Randstadrail network in The Hague, and at Serdika, on the Sofia Metro in Bulgaria.

A short spur line, running partly in a tunnel, runs from Manors to Jesmond. The line is used for empty stock movements only, and has no passenger service. Before the Metro tunnels were created, it was part of the main rail route to Newcastle, and connected to the main line at Manors.

The tunnels under Newcastle were mechanically bored through boulder clay, and lined with cast iron or concrete segments. The tunnel under Gateshead was bored through sandstone and excavated coal seams. Old coal mine workings, some of which dated from the Middle Ages, had to be filled in before the tunnelling began.

Level crossings 
There are seven level crossings on the Metro network, five of which are operated by Nexus and do not have barriers as the frequency of Metro services would make them impractical. Two others are situated near East Boldon on track shared with Network Rail, and have barriers due to the freight trains and National Rail services that use them.

Distances
Distances on the system are measured from a datum point at South Gosforth. The system is metric, with distances in kilometres, and rounded to the nearest metre. Lines are designated In and Out. The In line runs from St. James to South Shields via the inside of the North Tyneside Loop (via Wallsend then Whitley Bay), with the Out line running in the opposite direction. By extension, the In line runs from Airport to South Gosforth, and from Pelaw to South Hylton.

Distance plates are mounted on all overhead line structures. Different distances are normally quoted for stations, depending on whether the direction of travel is In or Out. Distances increase from the datum in all directions. The part of line between Pelaw and South Hylton owned by Network Rail is dual-marked in both metric units, as well as miles and chains. The boundary between the two systems is located at Pelaw Junction. The closest adjacent stations by distance on the network are St. Peter's and Sunderland, with the furthest apart being Pelaw and Fellgate.

Electrification
The Tyne and Wear Metro is electrified with overhead lines at 1,500VDC, and is now the only rail network in the United Kingdom to use this system. However, in doing this, a new fleet of dual-voltage trains would be required.

Ridership
During the 198586 financial year, the Tyne and Wear Metro carried a total of 59.1million passengers – the highest figure it has ever achieved. By 198788, this had declined to 44.9million. The decline was attributed to the loss of integration with bus services, following deregulation in 1986, as well as the general decline in public transport use in the area. Usage continued to decline during the 1990s, reaching a low of 32.5million during 200001. From the turn of the century, passenger usage rose and stabilised, fluctuating in a range of 3540million passengers annually. Prior to 201617, the Tyne and Wear Metro consistently ranked as the second-most used tram and light rail network in the United Kingdom, after London's Docklands Light Railway. Ridership significantly fell during the COVID-19 pandemic to an all-time low of 9.4million in 202021. The Metro is the third-most used tram and light rail network in the United Kingdom, after the Docklands Light Railway, closely following the Manchester Metrolink.

Branding and identity 
The Tyne and Wear Metro has a distinctive design and corporate identity, initially developed to distinguish itself from the antiquated rail system it replaced in the 1980s, as well as to match the livery of the buses operated by the Tyne and Wear Passenger Transport Executive, prior to deregulation in 1986. The Calvert typeface was designed by Margaret Calvert and first used on the Metro; it is used extensively throughout the system, including on the distinctive black M logo on a yellow background. The logo is used to denote the Metro, and is featured on cube signs at station entrances, as well as on board trains, and on station signage.

After the branding identity of the Metro became inconsistent and confused in the late 1990s and early 2000s, Nexus employed a local design agency, Gardiner Richardson, to help the organisation to revive the brand. In 2009, as part of the Metro: All Change programme, re-branding began to take place. Re-branding saw an emphasis placed on the Calvert typeface on lettering, signage and maps. It also saw the introduction of a simplified colour scheme of black, white, grey and yellow, to be used on refurbished stations, signage and trains. In 2009, Haymarket was the first station to be refurbished, using the new corporate branding and colour scheme.

Art 

There are more than 30 pieces of permanent art across the transport network in Tyne and Wear. A number of Metro stations feature commissioned works by various artists, including:

Haymarket: Canon (2010) by Lothar Goetz
Jarrow: Jarrow March (1984) by Vince Rea
Monkseaton: Beach and Shipyards (1983) by Mike Davies
Monument: Parson's Polygon (1985) by David Hamilton
Queen Elizabeth II Bridge: Nocturne (2007) by Nayan Kulkarni
Sunderland: Platform 5 (2011) by Jason Bruges Studio
Wallsend: Pontis (2003) by Michael Pinsky

Proposed future upgrades and development

Extension to Washington IAMP
There have been a number of proposals looking in to the possibility of re-opening the former Leamside line to Washington, including a 2009 report from the Association of Train Operating Companies (ATOC), and a 2016 proposal from the North East Combined Authority (NECA), as well as the abandoned Project Orpheus programme, from the early 2000s. As of 2019–20, proposals are being put forward to link the current network at Pelaw and South Hylton, with the International Advanced Manufacturing Park in Washington, using part of the alignment of the former Leamside line.

The first stages of a business case were published in November 2022. It will be evaluated by the North East Joint Transport Committee with the ambition to secure funding from the Government to cover the cost of the scheme, expected to be £745million.

See also 
 List of Tyne and Wear Metro stations
 Transport in Tyne and Wear
 Urban rail in the United Kingdom

References

Further reading

External links 

 
1500 V DC railway electrification
Airport rail links in the United Kingdom
Arriva Group companies
Electric railways in the United Kingdom
Light rail in the United Kingdom
Railway lines opened in 1980
Railway loop lines
Transport in Newcastle upon Tyne
Metro
Transport in Tyne and Wear
Tyne and Wear Passenger Transport Executive
Underground rapid transit in England